Peter Shiu Ka-fai (born 22 April 1970) is the current Chairman of the Liberal Party and a member of the Legislative Council of Hong Kong. He is also a former member of Eastern District Council, for Braemar Hill on Hong Kong Island.

He graduated from the University of Auckland in New Zealand. He is a Liberal Party member and has been a member of the Executive Committee since 2009. He is the chairperson of the Liberal Party’s Ban Gay Marriage Hong Kong and has suggested that children reading books about homosexuality might confuse them or distort how they think about families. In December 2014, he was elected Vice-Chairman of the party with Vincent Fang Kang and Felix Chung Kwok-pan as the party Leader and Chairman respectively.

In the 2016 Hong Kong legislative election, Shiu won a seat in the Wholesale and Retail functional constituency, keeping the seat in Liberal hands, with 65 percent of the vote.

He was appointed to the Buildings Appeal Tribunal Panel, Independent Police Complaints Commission and Observers and Business Facilitation Advisory Committee. He has been a member of the Eastern District Council since the 2007 District Council elections through the Braemar Hill constituency. In the 2011 Election Committee elections, he was elected to the Election Committee through Hong Kong and Kowloon District Council subsector.

In March 2021, Shiu claimed that RTHK was too biased against the Hong Kong Police Force, and asked if the government intended to "fix" the station.

He is a director of the Master Proofer Corporation.

See also
 LGBT rights in Hong Kong

References

1970 births
Living people
University of Auckland alumni
District councillors of Eastern District
Members of the Election Committee of Hong Kong, 2012–2017
Liberal Party (Hong Kong) politicians
HK LegCo Members 2016–2021
HK LegCo Members 2022–2025